Thomas Klasen (born 16 September 1983) is a retired German footballer and current football coach, most recently in charge of CS Fola Esch.

References

External links

1983 births
Living people
German footballers
SV Eintracht Trier 05 players
1. FC Kaiserslautern II players
Kickers Emden players
SV Elversberg players
TuS Koblenz players
2. Bundesliga players
3. Liga players

Association football midfielders
TuS Mayen players
People from Neuwied
Footballers from Rhineland-Palatinate
CS Fola Esch managers